The Duplicated Man is a science fiction novel which was  It was co-written by James Blish and Robert Lowndes. The Duplicated Man was first published in the August 1953 edition of Dynamic Science Fiction and in book form, in 1959 by Avalon Books.

Plot summary
At war with Venus for decades, the Earth's military authority stood its ground. Missiles kept raining down on Earth with unpredictable regularity. Nobody knew where the next missile would hit. But conventional wisdom dictated that every attack be met with a counter-attack.

However, a pacifist peace party sought to have a truce declared with Venus. Paul Danton, a member of a subversive political party, who believed in peace so be his answer to make peace was considered.

It was a peculiar stroke of luck that he found a human duplication machine. It was an old machine, and it didn't work reliably after the first five copies were made. But if he could just duplicate the right world leaders, essentially make extra copies of them, maybe he would have a chance bringing peace to Earth and Venus.

Reception
Floyd C. Gale of Galaxy Science Fiction rated The Duplicated Man three and a half stars out of five: "Deviousness of plotting and many thumbnail character sketches enliven the book".

See also
 Venus in fiction

References

1953 American novels
1953 science fiction novels
American science fiction novels
Novels by James Blish
Novels set on Venus
Novels about cloning
Avalon Books books